Warrant for Genocide: The Myth of the Jewish World-Conspiracy and the Protocols of the Elders of Zion, by Norman Cohn, is a critical work about The Protocols of the Elders of Zion.

This scholarly book explores the history, origin, and worldwide dissemination of this notorious, antisemitic plagiarism, literary forgery, and hoax.

See also
 A Brief History of Blasphemy

References

Scholarly journal review: Philip Mason Man, New Series, Vol. 2, No. 3 (September, 1967), pp. 474–475, Journal Information for Man, Publisher: Royal Anthropological Institute of Great Britain and Ireland, ; ; LCCN: sn99-23436 

1966 non-fiction books
Books about antisemitism
Protocols of the Elders of Zion